Norwood Airport  was located beside Highway 7,  southwest of Norwood, Ontario Canada, near Peterborough.

References

External links
 Duke Aviation Services, an ultralight flight school at the airport (site includes airport photos)
 Page about this airport on COPA's Places to Fly airport directory

Defunct airports in Ontario